Ronak Pandit (12 April 1985) is an Indian sport shooter. He won gold medal in the Men's 25m Standard Pistol (Pairs) with Samaresh Jung at the 2006 Commonwealth Games. He is married to Indian shooter Heena Sidhu and has a daughter named Reyah. He is also the coach of Indian pistol team preparing for Tokyo Olympics.

References

Indian male sport shooters
ISSF pistol shooters
Living people
1985 births
Shooters at the 2006 Commonwealth Games
Commonwealth Games gold medallists for India
Asian Games medalists in shooting
Shooters at the 2006 Asian Games
Commonwealth Games medallists in shooting
Asian Games silver medalists for India
Medalists at the 2006 Asian Games
21st-century Indian people
Medallists at the 2006 Commonwealth Games